Bilyana Zhivkova Dudova (born 1 August 1997) is a Bulgarian freestyle wrestler. She won the gold medal in the women's 59 kg event at the 2021 World Wrestling Championships in Oslo, Norway. She also won silver at the 2018 World Wrestling Championships and she is a five-time medalist, including four golds, at the European Wrestling Championships.

Career 

In 2016, she competed in the 53 kg event at the European Wrestling Championships held in Riga, Latvia. She also competed at the European Olympic Qualification Tournament hoping to qualify for the 2016 Summer Olympics in Rio de Janeiro, Brazil.

In 2017, she won the gold medal in the 55 kg event at the European Wrestling Championships held in Novi Sad, Serbia. She repeated this in 2018 in the 57 kg event and in 2019 in the 59 kg event. In 2020, she won the silver medal in the women's 59 kg event. In the final, she lost against Anastasia Nichita of Moldova.

At the 2018 European U23 Wrestling Championship in Istanbul, Turkey, she won the gold medal in the women's 59 kg event. In that same year, she won the silver medal in the women's 57 kg event at the 2018 World Wrestling Championships held in Budapest, Hungary. In the final, she lost against Rong Ningning of China.

In 2021, she won the gold medal in the 57kg event at the Dan Kolov & Nikola Petrov Tournament held in Plovdiv, Bulgaria. She also won the gold medal in the 59 kg event at the European Wrestling Championships held in Warsaw, Poland. She defeated Veronika Chumikova of Russia in the final.

She won the gold medal in the 62 kg event at the 2022 Dan Kolov & Nikola Petrov Tournament held in Veliko Tarnovo, Bulgaria. She also competed at the Yasar Dogu Tournament held in Istanbul, Turkey. She competed in the 62 kg event at the 2022 World Wrestling Championships held in Belgrade, Serbia.

Achievements

References

External links 

 

Living people
1997 births
Place of birth missing (living people)
Bulgarian female sport wrestlers
World Wrestling Championships medalists
European Wrestling Championships medalists
European Wrestling Champions
21st-century Bulgarian women